Richard Kent Lyons (born 1961) was the 14th Dean of the Haas School of Business, University of California, Berkeley, until 2018. In 2020 he became UC Berkeley's first Chief Innovation and Entrepreneurship Officer.

Biography
Lyons was born on February 10, 1961, in Palo Alto, California, USA. Lyons earned his BS in Business with highest honors from the Haas School of Business at University of California, Berkeley in 1982. In 1987 he received his PhD in Economics from MIT.  Lyons served as Acting Dean of the Haas School from 2004 to 2005, as Executive Associate Dean and Sylvan Coleman Professor of Finance from 2005 to 2006, and as Chief Learning Officer at Goldman Sachs in New York City from 2006 to 2008. Before coming to Haas, Lyons also spent six years on the faculty at Columbia Business School. His teaching expertise is in international finance. Lyons is fluent in French and is also an accomplished musician, owning several musical copyrights. He and his wife, Jennifer, have two children.

Research
Lyons’s early research focuses on currency markets, a focus reflected in his book “The Microstructure Approach to Exchange Rates” (MIT Press). This novel approach to exchange rates examines the market from a trading-room perspective, e.g., the flow of buy and sell orders and why those orders subsequently affect prices, rather than from the traditional perspective of macroeconomics. This line of work focuses on how dispersed information gets reflected in prices via trading. He has published numerous articles on these and other related topics. Recently, his research has taken a quite different tack, namely, exploring the links between leadership and innovation in organizations.

Teaching
Lyons is also a highly respected educator and a popular professor: in 1998 he received U.C. Berkeley’s highest teaching honor, the Distinguished Teaching Award, and has won the Haas School’s Teacher of the Year (Cheit) award six times.

Other professional activities
Lyons's past consulting relationships include the Federal Reserve Bank, the International Monetary Fund, the European Central Bank, and Citibank. He is a member of the Council on Foreign Relations, an Associate Editor of the California Management Review, and, prior to joining Goldman Sachs, served as Chair of the Board of Directors of Matthews Asia Funds, and a member of the Board of Directors of iShares (Barclays Global Investors).

References

External links
 Lyons's Twitter page
 Faculty Biography at the Haas School of Business
 Dean's Page at the Haas School of Business
 The Microstructure Approach to Exchange Rates at MIT Press

1961 births
Haas School of Business alumni
MIT School of Humanities, Arts, and Social Sciences alumni
Columbia Business School faculty
Haas School of Business faculty
Living people
Business school deans